Sanghmitra Maurya (born 3 January 1985) is an Indian politician and a member of the 17th Lok Sabha. She was elected to the Lok Sabha, the lower house of the Parliament of India from Badaun, Uttar Pradesh in the 2019 Indian general election as a member of the Bharatiya Janata Party, defeating senior Samajwadi Party leader Dharmendra Yadav. She earlier contested in  Mainpuri in 2014  as a member of the Bahujan Samaj Party but lost to Mulayam Singh Yadav.

Personal life 
Maurya was born on 3 January 1985 in Allahabad city in Uttar Pradesh to politicians Swami Prasad Maurya and Shiva Maurya. She is a practitioner of Buddhism. Her family converted to Buddhism from Hinduism. She did her M.B.B.S in 2010 from ERA's Lucknow Medical College, Lucknow, then under Dr. Ram Manohar Lohia Avadh University. Her husband, Dr. Naval Kishore Shakya is a Cancer Surgeon and owner of Lakshaya Cancer Hospital Lucknow who joined Samajwadi Party in 2018. They have a son. Due to irrevocable differences, Maurya filed for divorce on 21 December 2017 in Lucknow and she was granted a divorce on 19 January 2021.

See also
 Sangh Priya Gautam

References

External links
 Official biographical sketch in Lok Sabha website

1985 births
Living people
India MPs 2019–present
Lok Sabha members from Uttar Pradesh
Indian Buddhists
20th-century Buddhists
21st-century Buddhists
Bharatiya Janata Party politicians from Uttar Pradesh
People from Budaun
Politicians from Allahabad
Bahujan Samaj Party politicians
Converts to Buddhism from Hinduism